Crassula nudicaulis is a succulent plant native to South Africa (the Cape Provinces, the Free State, KwaZulu-Natal and the Northern Provinces), and Lesotho.

Description

Crassula nudicaulis is a perennial succulent herb with a thickened taproot and several low rosettes of basal leaves. Plants are somewhat variable in appearance and there are several subspecies over the plant's wide range. 

The leaves of this species can turn brown, but they do not adopt the brick red hues sometimes taken on by Crassula subacaulis and Crassula clavata. 

The inflorescence is a spike, with bracts that are not ciliate; the lowest one to three pairs of bracts have no flowers in the axils but the others do. The flowers are turned upwards, they have yellow anthers and distinctive dorsal appendages. 

This species is closely related to Crassula cotyledonis, which is a more robust species that has marginal leaf-hair in more than one line. 
It can also be confused with Crassula clavata, but that species has glabrous (smooth), oblanceolate-obovate leaves that turn deep purple-red in the sun.

Subspecies variation 
This species is variable, and several subspecies exist: 
 subsp. platyphylla: This southern Karoo subspecies has blue-grey foliage; the leaves are broadly oblong to orbicular with cilia near the margins.

Distribution and habitat
Crassula nudicaulis is native to southern Africa where its range extends from the Western Cape to the Eastern Cape, KwaZulu-Natal, Free State and Lesotho. Its habitat is hillside and mountain slopes.

Cultivation
Crassula nudicaulis is easy to grow as a potplant in a gravelly medium. Mealy bugs and fungal diseases can cause problems, and over-watering should be avoided. Propagation is by division, offsets or leaf cuttings.

References

nudicaulis
Flora of the Cape Provinces
Flora of the Free State
Flora of KwaZulu-Natal
Flora of Lesotho
Flora of the Northern Provinces
Plants described in 1753
Taxa named by Carl Linnaeus